Nevada Community School District is a rural public school district headquartered in Nevada, Iowa. It operates an elementary school, a middle school, and a high school.

The district is entirely in Story County, and serves Nevada and the surrounding rural area. A small section of the Ames city limits is in the district.

History

In 1958, the schools of Nevada and Shipley, an unincorporated community in Story County, consolidated into a single school district.

Schools
The district operates three schools, all in Nevada.
Central Elementary School
Nevada Middle School
Nevada High School

Nevada High School

Athletics
The Cubs compete in the Heart of Iowa Conference in the following sports:

Cross Country (boys and girls)
Volleyball
 2015 Class 3A State Champion 
Football
Basketball (boys and girls)
 Girls' 2015 Class 3A State Champions 
Wrestling
Track and Field (boys and girls)
Boys' - 4-time State Champions (1949, 1950, 1976, 1977))
Soccer (boys and girls)
 Boys' 2000 Class 1A State Champions
Golf (boys and girls)
Tennis (boys and girls)
Baseball 
Softball

See also
List of school districts in Iowa
List of high schools in Iowa

References

External links
 Nevada Community School District

School districts in Iowa
Education in Story County, Iowa
School districts established in 1958
1958 establishments in Iowa